Woodhouse is a Georgian mansion and c. 500-acre estate just outside the village of Stradbally, County Waterford, Ireland.

The original house was built in the early part of the 16th century by the Fitzgeralds (a branch of the Desmond Geraldines) and was owned by them up to 1724.  By 1774 it was recorded as being in the possession of the Uniake family, and by the time of Griffith's Valuation in 1868 it was owned by Robert Uniacke and was valued at £52 10s.

In 1855 the house came into the ownership of a branch of the Beresford family and in 1894 the house and estate were recorded as the seat of Robert H. Beresford. In 1906 it was the property of John Beresford and still valued at over £52. In 1942, the Irish Tourist Association survey notes that the owner of the house, Major Lord William Beresford was then resident in India.

The Irish National Inventory of Architectural Heritage describes the house as:
Detached three-bay single-storey over basement gate lodge, c.1850, with three-bay two-storey rear elevation to south. Renovated and refenestrated, c.1950, with single-bay single-storey flat-roofed projecting porch added. Now disused. Hipped slate roof with clay ridge tiles, rendered chimney stacks, and cast-iron rainwater goods on timber eaves. Flat bitumen felt roof to porch with metal rainwater goods. Painted rendered walls with rendered quoins to corners. Square-headed window openings with stone sills, and one with rendered surround having hood moulding over on consoles. Replacement timber casement windows, c.1950. Square-headed door opening with glazed tongue-and-groove timber panelled door, c.1950. Set back from road in grounds shared with Woodhouse at entrance to estate with side (east) elevation fronting on to road.

The property was bought in 2012 by James E. (Jim) Thompson, founder and chairman of Crown Worldwide Group for €6.5m.

References

External links
 Official site

Historic Houses in County Waterford